Eupithecia eupompa is a moth in the family Geometridae first described by Claude Herbulot in 1987. It is found in Ecuador.

References

Moths described in 1987
eupompa
Moths of South America